Adeleke Oluwatobiloba Adeyinka Omole (born 17 December 1999) is an English professional footballer who plays as a defender for  club Crawley Town. He has previously played in the Premier League 2 with Arsenal and Tottenham Hotspur's under-23 sides.

Career

Early career
Omole was scouted for Arsenal's academy as a box-to-box midfielder from Thamesmead Town in 2014. He signed a two-year scholarship with the club in summer 2016, before signing a two-year professional contract in summer 2018. During his time with Arsenal's under-18 and under-23 sides he played as a left-back, centre-back and defensive midfielder. He was released by Arsenal in summer 2020.

In September 2020, following his release by Arsenal, he joined Tottenham Hotspur on trial. He signed a one-year deal with the club the following month. His contract was extended by a year at the end of the season. He was promoted to first-team training in February 2022, but was released by Tottenham upon the expiry of his contract at the end of the season.

Crawley Town
On 9 July 2022, Omole joined EFL League Two club Crawley Town on a two-year contract. Upon signing for the club, Omole suggested that "getting promoted is the most important thing for the team". He made his debut for the club in their 1–0 opening day defeat to Carlisle United on 30 July 2022, which Omole described as a "frustrating game".

Personal life
Born in London, Omole is of Nigerian descent.

Style of play
Omole is left-footed and is capable of playing as a left-back, centre-back and defensive midfielder. He describes himself as a "ball-playing centre-back".

References

1999 births
Living people
English footballers
English sportspeople of Nigerian descent
Footballers from Greater London
Association football defenders
Thamesmead Town F.C. players
Arsenal F.C. players
Tottenham Hotspur F.C. players
Crawley Town F.C. players
English Football League players